The Biltmore Area is an upscale residential neighborhood of Phoenix, Arizona. It is among the city's wealthiest neighborhoods, with a "posh" reputation. The Arizona Biltmore Hotel is in the area. Housing includes both condominiums as well as mansions and older homes.Biltmore 85016: Area includes mansions, older homes, The Republic (April 23, 2015). Plans for golf course expansion in the area in the late 2010s and 2020s encountered opposition from some neighborhood residents, prompting litigation.

Landmarks
Biltmore Fashion Park
Wrigley Mansion

See also
North/Northwest Phoenix

References

External links
AzBiltmore.com - Arizona Biltmore Neighborhood Portal
Biltmore Area Partnership

Neighborhoods in Phoenix, Arizona